Fritz Wittmann (21 March 1933 – 17 October 2018) was a German politician (CSU) and lawyer.

Biography
Wittmann was born in Plan in Czechoslovakia's region of Egerland (today Planá in the Czech Republic). He was a member of the German Parliament (first elected in 1971), where he represented Munich North, and president of the Federation of Expellees (Bund der Vertriebenen) from 1994 to 1998. He was succeeded as president of the federation by Erika Steinbach (CDU).

He was a colonel in the reserve and recipient of the Badge of Honour of the Bundeswehr in Gold.

References

External links
 Bundestag bio 

1933 births
2018 deaths
People from Planá
Sudeten German people
20th-century German lawyers
Christian Social Union in Bavaria politicians
Members of the Bundestag for Bavaria
Members of the Bundestag 1994–1998
Members of the Bundestag 1990–1994
Recipients of the Badge of Honour of the Bundeswehr